Tomb KV26, located in Egypt's Valley of the Kings, was visited by James Burton, and then probably by Victor Loret. Nothing is known about its occupant(s), but it is believed to be an 18th Dynasty tomb because of its similarities to others of that period. Although it is exceptionally short, with a total length of less than 12 metres, it has not yet been fully cleared or  excavated.

References
Reeves, N & Wilkinson, R.H. The Complete Valley of the Kings, 1996, Thames and Hudson, London.
Siliotti, A. Guide to the Valley of the Kings and to the Theban Necropolises and Temples, 1996, A.A. Gaddis, Cairo.

External links
Theban Mapping Project: KV26 includes detailed maps of most of the tombs.

Valley of the Kings